Ryves Comet, also known as C/1931 P1, 1931 E or 1931c, was discovered by Percy Mayow Ryves, an English amateur astronomer, on August 14, 1931. His find was made using a small telescope in Zaragoza, Spain. The comet was later observed from the Yerkes Observatory and the University of California Leuschner Observatory.

Very near Sun

It appeared as a ball of hot gas traveling at one hundred miles per second from the Naval Observatory.  The comet passed within 7,000,000 miles of the Sun on August 26. A wanderer in the Solar System, it is considered unlikely to return from
outer space.

Ryves Comet was of ninth magnitude brightness by October 9, 1931, and was not observable with the
naked eye. Astronomers at the Yerkes Observatory waited until just prior to dawn to observe and
photograph it. The comet came into view just ahead of the Sun. Yerkes Observatory director, Edwin B. Frost, determined that Ryves Comet was two hours east of the Sun and seven degrees removed from it. In October it was one hundred times fainter than when it was first observed in August.

References

Non-periodic comets
19310814
Discoveries by amateur astronomers